James Francis Huggard (1 February 1894 – 29 March 1965) was an Australian rules footballer who played with Richmond in the Victorian Football League (VFL).

In 1926, Huggard was appointed as captain / coach of the Corowa Football Club in the Ovens and Murray Football League.

Notes

External links 

1894 births
1965 deaths
Australian rules footballers from Victoria (Australia)
Richmond Football Club players